Emanuele Gaudiano (born 30 June 1986) is an Italian Olympic show jumping rider. He competed at the 2016 Summer Olympics in Rio de Janeiro, Brazil, where he finished 67th in the individual competition.

Gaudiano participated at the 2014 World Equestrian Games and at three European Show Jumping Championships (in 2011, 2013 and 2015). He finished 7th in the team competition at the 2013 European Championships held in Herning, Denmark.

His main horse is called Chalou.

References

1986 births
Living people
Italian show jumping riders
Italian male equestrians
Olympic equestrians of Italy
People from Matera
Equestrians at the 2016 Summer Olympics
Place of birth missing (living people)
Equestrians of Centro Sportivo Carabinieri
Equestrians at the 2020 Summer Olympics
Sportspeople from the Province of Matera